Compostela, officially the Municipality of Compostela,  is a 3rd class municipality in the province of Cebu, Philippines. According to the 2020 census, it has a population of 55,874 people.

Compostela is within the Metro Cebu area.

History

In the year 1844, Spanish authorities established local government units on the northern part of Cebu starting from what is now known as the town of Compostela as far north as what is now called the town of Borbon. Compostela was among the early barrios of the Danao. The newly established barrio was named Compostela on the suggestion of a Roman Catholic friar who came from the town of Santiago de Compostela in Spain and brought along with him the image of that town's patron saint, St. James the Great.

Adopting the said saint as the local patron, a parish chapel was built from light materials. As the population grew, the Spanish church authorities decided to elevate the chapel into a church so that in the year 1866 the catholic church was constructed on the same site. Up to present time, the same structure continues to be the major place of worship in Compostela.

At the turn of the 20th century, the Americans gained control over the Philippines when they defeated the Spaniards in the Battle of Manila Bay. As a consequence, the Treaty of Paris caused the reorganization and reclassification of all local government units in the country according to their population and income. The reorganization which took place in 1903 resulted in the secession of Compostela to Liloan. In 1919, Compostela became a municipality.

Geography
Compostela is bordered on the north by the city of Danao, to the west by Cebu City, on the east by the Camotes Sea, and on the south by the town of Liloan.

Barangays

Compostela comprises 17 barangays:

Climate

Demographics

Economy

References

External links

Municipalities of Cebu
Municipalities in Metro Cebu